Damned – The Strange World of José Mojica Marins (original title: Maldito - O Estranho Mundo de José Mojica Marins) is a 2001 Brazilian documentary film directed by André Barcinski and Ivan Finotti.

Overview
The film tells the story of the Brazilian filmmaker, director, screenwriter, film and television actor and media personality José Mojica Marins. The film features Marins (as himself) and his associates and family members recounting episodes of his life and career from childhood to international recognition in later years.

Accolades
The film received the Special Jury Award in Latin American Cinema at the 2001 Sundance Film Festival.

Cast
José Mojica Marins	(as himself)
Mário Lima 	
Rubens Lucchetti
Conceição Marins
Nilcemar Leyart

See also
Demons and Wonders
Coffin Joe

References

External links

Official Coffin Joe website

2001 films
Brazilian documentary films
Brazilian independent films
2000s Portuguese-language films
Documentary films about film directors and producers
2001 documentary films